This is a list of video games that use near field communication (NFC) technology.

Currently, games have leveraged NFC in unlocking additional features through payment. This takes the form of a direct transaction over NFC or by purchasing a physical item, which signals to the platform that a certain set of features has been purchased (e.g. Skylanders). This list catalogues gaming NFC platforms by device.

Mobile

Android 
 Gun Bros.
 Near Field Ninja
 NFC Cards
 Skylanders, with additional tools necessary

iOS

As item-triggered game enhancement
 Disney Infinity, with app download necessary
 Skylanders, with additional tools necessary

As payment
 In-App Purchases
Here, games that leverage Apple's In-App Purchase framework use information stored in the NFC Secure Element to process the purchase through Apple Pay. While an NFC radio is not used here, the NFC protocol is used nonetheless.

Other 
For mobile consoles, like the Nintendo 3DS see Console.

Console

Nintendo Wii, Wii U, Switch and 3DS

As item-triggered game enhancement
 Pokémon Rumble U NFC Figure
 The Legend of Zelda: Breath of the Wild Amiibo Figures
 Amiibo, built into Nintendo consoles since 2014. Works with Wii U and New 3DS, Nintendo Switch and older Nintendo 3DS systems via a peripheral device.
 Disney Infinity, with an NFC base
 Skylanders, with an NFC base. Works with Wii and later, and 3DS and later.

As payment
 The Wii U GamePad controller can read information from an NFC data source.

PlayStation
 Disney Infinity, with an NFC base. Works with PlayStation 3 and PlayStation 4
 Skylanders, with an NFC base

Xbox
 Disney Infinity, with an NFC base. Works with Xbox 360 and Xbox One
 Skylanders, with an NFC base

References

NFC
Digital media
Mobile telecommunications
Wireless
Near-field communication